The Adelaide Strikers are an Australian professional Twenty20 franchise cricket team based in Adelaide, South Australia that compete in the Big Bash League (BBL). Their home ground is the Adelaide Oval, and they play in a cornflower blue uniform. The Strikers were formed in 2011 to play in the BBL, succeeding the Southern Redbacks, who played in the now-defunct KFC Twenty20 Big Bash competition. Their sole victory in the BBL came in 2017–18.

Over their 11-year history in the BBL, they have had many effective and popular players on their team, from all-rounders such as Johan Botha, Michael Neser, Kieron Pollard, Ryan ten Doeschate and Chris Jordan, to high-scoring batsmen Travis Head, Colin Ingram, Mahela Jayawardene, Jonathan Wells, Michael Klinger and Jake Weatherald, to effective bowlers Ben Laughlin, Billy Stanlake, Rashid Khan, Peter Siddle, Adil Rashid and Kane Richardson, and finally keepers Alex Carey and Tim Ludeman.

The Strikers are currently coached by former Australian cricketer Jason Gillespie and captained by Head. Carey is the current vice-captain.

History
The Adelaide Strikers were formed in 2011, as a result of the formation of the Big Bash League. When the competition was first formed, each team had an opportunity to sign up players and build their lists. The contracting window opened on 30 June 2011 at 9 am and closed on 22 July 2011. Each team was allowed to sign up to 18 players, including up to two from overseas. The team's inaugural captain was South Australia captain, Michael Klinger, and the inaugural coach was Darren Berry, the then coach of the Southern Redbacks.

In the 2016/17 Big Bash, the Adelaide Strikers were rated the most entertaining team in the BBL, with a BBEI of 2177.

New Year's Eve match
Since BBL03, Cricket Australia started hosting a Strikers home match on 31 December night every year against different oppositions. It quickly gained popularity among the fans, turning into a tradition and attracting big crowds at the Adelaide Oval throughout the years. It is popularly termed as the New Year's Eve Match or NYE Clash in the media. Up until BBL08, the Strikers had maintained a clean 6–0 win record in the NYE Big Bash clashes. In season 3, Travis Head scored a brilliant century to take the Strikers home against Sydney Sixers in the NYE clash, which remains one of the most memorable NYE matches in the short history of BBL to date. Though, in BBL09, the Strikers finally fell against the Sydney Thunder by 3 runs, the Strikers' first defeat on New Year's Eve.

The Strikers haven't won a New Year's Eve game since 2018, currently going on a 4 year losing streak.

List of New Year's Eve matches

Sponsors

Current squad
The current squad of the Adelaide Strikers for the 2022–23 Big Bash League season as of 6 December 2022.
 Players with international caps are listed in bold.

List of Captains

List of international players

Series results

Records

Team records

Result summary v. opponent

Highest innings total

Batting

Most runs

Highest scores

Highest partnerships by wicket

Bowling

Most wickets

Best bowling figures

Honours

Domestic
Big Bash:
Champions (1): 2017–18
Runners-Up (0): 
Minor Premiers (2): 2014–15, 2015–16
Finals series Appearances (5): 2014–15, 2015–16, 2017–18, 2019–20, 2020–21
Wooden Spoons (0):

International
Champions League Twenty20:
Appearances (0):

See also

Big Bash League
South Australian Cricket Association
South Australia cricket team

References

External links

 
Big Bash League teams
Cricket in South Australia
2011 establishments in Australia
Cricket clubs established in 2011
Sporting clubs in Adelaide